Chinese Characters Dictation Competition is a weekly television program where contestants write Chinese characters after hearing the words. The show now broadcasts on CCTV-1.

The show was inspired by spelling bees in the United States.

List of champions

References 

Chinese characters
Chinese television shows
Competitions in China
Language competitions
Chinese game shows
2013 Chinese television series debuts